Fabio Araujo Lefundes is a Brazilian football manager. He is currently head coach of Madura United F.C. in the Liga 1.

Career
Lefundes has extensive experience in professional football since 1995. He spent two seasons at Al Raed Sports Club in Saudi Arabia and one season at Al-Mesaimeer Sports Club in Qatar. At Al Raed, he was assistant coach and fitness coach, and was also interim coach for two months in the 2010–2011 season.

Lefundes first came to Jeonbuk Hyundai Motors as a physical coach in January 2011. His influence on the physical aspect of the team resulted in their being crowned as 2011 K-League champion and Runner up of the 2011 AFC Champions League. The following year Lefundes was rewarded with a three-year contract and moved up to the assistant coach position whilst still co-ordinating the club's fitness program. During the first half of 2013, he was the interim coach, replacing the manager Choi Kang-Hee who was in the South Korea national football team.

During his seven years at Jeonbuk Hyundai, Lefundes won four K-League Classics (2011, 2014, 2015, and 2017) and an Asia Champions League (2016). He was runner-up in two K-League Classics (2012 and 2016) and one Asian Champions League (2011).

Lefundes then moved to China's Shandong Luneng Taishan F.C., where he will be working for the first time.

Lefundes worked at Shandong Luneng Taishan FC for two years (2018 and 2019).
The first year was extremely productive, where the team reached 3rd place in the Chinese Super League and was runner-up in the Chinese FA CUP after two games and two qualified draws against Beijing Guoan (1x1 and 2x2).
The following year, the team participated in the AFC Champions League due to their placement in the previous year's CSL. Shandong Luneng managed to rank 1st in the group stage and were eliminated in the round of 16 by Guangzhou Evergrande on penalties.
At CSL he didn't have the same performance as the previous year, even so he finished in 5th place overall. And once again he was a finalist for the Chinese FA CUP, and lost to the Shanghai Shenhua Greenland FC team. They won the first home game 1-0 and lost the second away game 3–0.
Lefundes did not renew his contract with the club and the COVID pandemic directly affected his professional future.

In 2020 he accepted the invitation of coach Bruno Lazaroni to work at Botafogo FR (club of the 1st division of the Brazilian championship). The experience could have been better if the club hadn't been going through a period of political disputes. The results were better than expected and even so they left the club early, according to the opinion of several experts.

References

1972 births
Living people
Brazilian football managers
Olaria Atlético Clube managers
Americano Futebol Clube managers
Al-Raed FC managers
Jeonbuk Hyundai Motors managers
Expatriate football managers in South Korea
Shandong Taishan F.C. non-playing staff
Association football coaches
Footballers from Rio de Janeiro (city)